Eyota can refer to a community in the United States:

 The city of Eyota, Minnesota
 Eyota Township, Minnesota